Kenneth Lampl (born November 7, 1964) is an American composer and lecturer known for his film, television and choral music. He is the former head of the Australian National University School of Music.

Biography
Born in the Bronx, New York, Lampl studied saxophone with Paul Jeffrey and Sahib Shihab at Rutgers University and was a member of the Rutgers University Jazz Ensemble After college he went on tour with jazz drummer Chico Hamilton giving performances at Lincoln Center, the Apollo Theater and the JVC Jazz Festival. Lampl began his first classical composition studies with Pulitzer Prize winning composer Charles Wuorinen in the graduate program at Rutgers University. Lampl's first international recognition came with the winning of the "Prix Ravel" in composition from the American Conservatory in Fontainebleau, France and his first orchestral piece "Parallax" won the Cincinnati Symphony Orchestra Young Composers Award, the ASCAP Awards for Young Composers. and the Joseph H. Bearns Prize in Composition from Columbia University.  In 1996 Lampl received his DMA in Composition from the Juilliard School studying with Milton Babbitt and John Corigliano, and taught Literature and Materials of Music there in the academic years 1996-1999.  At the Juilliard School he received the Gretchanov Memorial Prize in Composition and fellowships from the foundations of Henry Mancini, George Gershwin and Richard Rodgers. In 1998 he was awarded a composer fellowship to the Tanglewood Music Festival where he studied film scoring with John Williams.

Film scoring
Lampl's first film score "Six Miles of Eight Feet" premiered at the Sundance Film Festival 2000 and won a Student Academy Awards as well as Best Original Score from the NYU First Run Film Festival.  His next score "Empty" won Best Narrative Short at the Cinequest San Jose Film Festival and a Student Emmy award.  His first feature length scoring came with composing music for Pokémon: The First Movie and Pokémon: Mewtwo Returns.

He has scored over 90 films including: Frontera (starring Ed Harris and Eva Longoria), 35 and Ticking (starring Kevin Hart and Nicole Ari Parker), Winter of Frozen Dreams (starring Thora Birch and Keith Carradine) and Royal Kill (starring Pat Morita and Eric Roberts), as well as the television series Born Again Virgin and Saints & Sinners He frequently collaborates with electronic artist and producer Darren Tate and Kirsten Axelholm.  His recent score to Seth Larney's film 2067 was listed in "The Best Scores of 2020" by the Film Music Institute.  The 2067 soundtrack was released on Milan Records.

Choral music
Lampl is a prolific composer of choral music.  His first choral work in Hebrew "Adon Olam" was premiered and recorded by the Zamir Chorale of Boston. Other notable choral works include: "Jerusalem", "After the Wind" and "Dirshu Adonai" which were compositions featured by the American Choral Directors Association. His choral music is currently published by Walton Music, Santa Barbara Music Publishing and Colla Voce Music.

Australia

From March 2017 – 2019, he served as the Head of the ANU School of Music and is currently the Convenor of the Composition for Film and Video Game Program.

References

External links
 
 

1964 births
American film score composers
American jazz composers
Juilliard School alumni
Lecturers
Living people
American male jazz composers
American male film score composers
Rutgers University alumni